{{Infobox rugby league season
 | year = 2013
 | competition = Papua New Guinea National Rugby League (Digicel Cup)
 | logo= 
 | imagesize = 
 | caption =
 | duration = 
 | teams = 12
 | premiers = Port Moresby Vipers
 | count =
 | minor premiers = Goroka Lahanis
 | mpcount = 
 | matches = 
 | points = 
 | attendance = 
 | avg_attendance = 
 | top point scorer = 
 | top try scorer = 
 | player of the year = 
 | prevseason_year = 2012
 | nextseason_year = 2014 | TV =
 | website = https://www.pngnrl.com
}}

The 2013 Papua New Guinea National Rugby League season (or for sponsorship reasons, the 2013 Digicel Cup'''), was the 24th season of rugby league in Papua New Guinea. The season was won by the Port Moresby Vipers who defeated the Goroka Lahanis, who won the minor premiership, in the grand final.

Teams

Ladder

References

2013 in Papua New Guinea rugby league
2013 in Papua New Guinean sport
2013 in rugby league